The Cross of Valour Association of Australia is made up of holders of the Cross of Valour (Australia), the highest civilian award for bravery.  The Cross of Valour is awarded "only for acts of the most conspicuous courage in circumstances of extreme peril". The award carries the post-nominal initials CV; awards may be made posthumously.

The Honourable Quentin Bryce AD, CVO and Mr Michael Bryce AM, AW are the official Patrons of the Cross of Valour Association of Australia.

The association was formed in 2013.

CVAA Presidents
Allan Sparkes 2013 to present

CVAA Vice Presidents
Timothy Britten 2013 to 2015

Darrel Tree 2016

Timothy Britten 2017 to present

CVAA Secretary
John Meyers 2013 to 2014

Clive Johnson 2015 to present

External links

2013 establishments in Australia